Jenipapo dos Vieiras is a Brazilian municipality in the state of Maranhão. Its population is 17,040 (2020) and its total area is 1,963 km2.

References

Municipalities in Maranhão